Pedro Ponce de León was a Benedictine monk.

Pedro Ponce de León may also refer to:

Pedro Ponce de León (bishop of Plasencia) (1510–1573), Spanish Roman Catholic bishop
Pedro Ponce de Léon (bishop of Zamora) (born 1561), Spanish Roman Catholic bishop
Pedro Ponce de León the Elder (died 1352), Castilian nobleman
Pedro Ponce de León (Adelantado) (died 1314), Castilian nobleman